Jeffrey Daniels is a Chicago-raised African-American poet, artist, and professor at Harold Washington College. He has previously taught at Columbia College Chicago and the School of the Art Institute of Chicago.

Works
God Noise (2004)
Black Girls and Bicycles (2006)

See also

African American literature
List of African-American writers

References

External links 
 
 

Year of birth missing (living people)
Living people
African-American poets
Writers from Chicago
American male poets
Columbia College Chicago alumni
21st-century African-American people
African-American male writers